The Embassy of the Republic of Korea to Denmark in Copenhagen is the diplomatic mission of the Republic of Korea to the Kingdom of Denmark. The current ambassador is Kim Hyung-Gil.

History
After diplomatic relations has been established between Denmark and the Republic of Korea on 11 March 1959, the Embassy of the Republic of Korea to Denmark was established on 5 April 1972.

See also
Denmark–South Korea relations
List of diplomatic missions in Denmark
List of diplomatic missions of South Korea

References

External links
 Official Website of the Embassy of the Republic of Korea to Denmark (Korean)
 Official Website of the Embassy of the Republic of Korea to Denmark (English)
 Official Website of the Embassy of the Republic of Korea to Denmark (Danish)

Korea, South
Copenhagen
Denmark–South Korea relations